Malawa may refer to the following places:
 Malawa, Przemyśl County, Poland
 Malawa, Rzeszów County, Poland
 Malawa, Niger